James River Bridge is an unincorporated community in central Alberta in Clearwater County, located  east of Highway 22,  southwest of Red Deer.  Its first school opened in 1921.

References 

Localities in Clearwater County, Alberta